Guinda (Spanish for "Sour cherry") is a census-designated place in Yolo County, California. Guinda's ZIP Code is 95637 and the town is in area code 530. It lies at an elevation of 361 feet (110 m).

A post office was opened in the town in 1889.

The town was named by Southern Pacific Railroad officials after a cherry tree at the site.

Geography
According to the United States Census Bureau, the CDP covers an area of 2.9 square miles (7.5 km), all of it land.

Demographics

The 2010 United States Census reported that Guinda had a population of 254. The racial makeup of Guinda was 175 (68.9%) White, 26 (10.2%) African American, 0 (0.0%) Native American, 1 (0.4%) Asian, 1 (0.4%) Pacific Islander, 43 (16.9%) from other races, and 8 (3.1%) from two or more races. Hispanic or Latino of any race were 68 persons (26.8%).

The Census reported that 254 people (100% of the population) lived in households, 0 (0%) lived in non-institutionalized group quarters, and 0 (0%) were institutionalized.

There were 104 households, out of which 23 (22.1%) had children under the age of 18 living in them, 67 (64.4%) were opposite-sex married couples living together, 4 (3.8%) had a female householder with no husband present, 2 (1.9%) had a male householder with no wife present.  There were 4 (3.8%) unmarried opposite-sex partnerships, and 2 (1.9%) same-sex married couples or partnerships. 24 households (23.1%) were made up of individuals, and 10 (9.6%) had someone living alone who was 65 years of age or older. The average household size was 2.44.  There were 73 families (70.2% of all households); the average family size was 2.88.

The population was spread out, with 46 people (18.1%) under the age of 18, 19 people (7.5%) aged 18 to 24, 39 people (15.4%) aged 25 to 44, 97 people (38.2%) aged 45 to 64, and 53 people (20.9%) who were 65 years of age or older.  The median age was 50.8 years. For every 100 females, there were 103.2 males.  For every 100 females age 18 and over, there were 108.0 males.

The homeowner vacancy rate was 2.3%; the rental vacancy rate was 5.0%.  191 people (75.2% of the population) lived in owner-occupied housing units and 63 people (24.8%) lived in rental housing units.

See also
County Fire
Sand Fire

References

External links
United States Geological Survey

Census-designated places in Yolo County, California
Census-designated places in California